The Gift is actor and author Kirk Douglas's second novel. First published in 1992, it is a romance about orphaned and depressed heiress Patricia Dennison, and a handsome, injured bullfighter, Miguel Cardiga.

References

1992 American novels
Novels about orphans
Novels by Kirk Douglas